Jang Sung-ho may refer to:
 Jang Sung-ho (baseball)
 Jang Sung-ho (judoka)